Jani Wickholm (born 20 September 1977, in Kerava) is a Finnish pop/rock singer. He came in second place on the Finnish MTV3 show Finnish Idols in 2004 after Hanna Pakarinen. Both Wickholm and Pakarinen had previously worked as truck-drivers.

Wickholm's albums have been comparably successful to the albums of Hanna Pakarinen. His debut album Kaikki muuttuu (Everything changes) topped the Finnish album chart. Wickholm's second album Alumiinitähdet (Aluminium stars) stayed on the chart for three weeks.

Wickholm lives in Jämsä in 2012.

Discography

Albums 
 Kaikki muuttuu (Everything changes) (2004)
 Alumiinitähdet (Aluminium stars) (2005)
 Yhden lauseen mies (Man of one sentence) (2007)
 Ranta-ahon valot  (2008)
 Jouluksi kotiin  (2008)
 Aivan eri mies  (2012)

Singles 
 "Hukun (I'm drowning)" (2004)
 "Kaikki muuttuu (Everything changes)" (2004) (promo)
 "Siivet (Wings)" (2004) (promo)
 "Langennut sinuun (Fallen for you)" (2004) (promo)
 "Alumiinitähdet (Aluminium stars)" (2005) (promo)
 "Suomenneito (Maid of Finland)" (2005) (promo)
 "Kuu (The moon)" (2007) (promo)
 "Jukeboksin runoilija (Jukebox's poet)" (2007) (promo)

Music videos 
 "Kaikki muuttuu"
 "Suomenneito"

References

External links
Official website 
Jani Wickholm 

1977 births
Living people
20th-century Finnish male singers
Idols (franchise) participants
People from Kerava